Mondli Abednego Chiliza is a South African politician who has represented the African National Congress (ANC) in the KwaZulu-Natal Provincial Legislature since 2019. He was formerly the Mayor of Ugu District Municipality from 2017 to 2019, and in April 2022 he was elected as Regional Chairperson of the ANC's Lower South Coast branch in KwaZulu-Natal.

Political career 
Chiliza was Deputy Mayor of Ugu under Mayor Tolomane Mnyayiza, who died in December 2016; Chiliza was elected to succeed him on 29 March 2017. Later that year, he reportedly supported Nkosazana Dlamini-Zuma's unsuccessful bid to be elected ANC President at the party's 54th National Conference.

He remained in the mayoral office until the 2019 general election, when he was elected to a seat in the KwaZulu-Natal Provincial Legislature, ranked 31st on the ANC's provincial party list. He was succeeded as Mayor by Sizwe Ngcobo.

On 3 April 2022, at a party elective conference, Chiliza was elected Regional Chairperson of the ANC's Lower South Coast regional branch, beating Phumlile Mthiyane, the incumbent Mayor of Ugu, in a vote. He and his new deputy, Skhumbuzo "Zero" Mqadi, denied rumours that they were politically aligned to former ANC President Jacob Zuma and ANC presidential candidate Zweli Mkhize.

Personal life 
Chiliza's 13-year-old daughter died in April 2022, the same week that he was elected ANC Regional Chairperson; she was reportedly struck by lightning.

References

External links 
 

Living people
Year of birth missing (living people)
African National Congress politicians
21st-century South African politicians
Members of the KwaZulu-Natal Legislature
Mayors of places in South Africa